"Over the Top" is a song by Canadian rapper Smiley, featuring fellow Canadian rapper Drake. It was released on July 23, 2021, by OVO Sound and Warner Records and later appeared on 
smiley's album Buy Or Bye 2. The duo had previously collaborated on Smiley's 2019 track "Organization" with Canadian rapper Booggz.

Background
Drake has described Smiley as an "inspiration" for his Scorpion album and that he had also listened to Smiley's previous EP. This relationship leading back to 2014 led to the collaboration of "Over the Top". At the time the single was released, it was also announced that Drake had signed Smiley to his label OVO Sound, in conjunction with Warner Records. In a tweet, Smiley stated that Drake and him had originally recorded a different song, but it leaked online. In the song, the pair go verse for verse. Smiley's verse was noted for his "one of a kind flow" and his "cartoonish Snaggletooth wheeze" voice.

Production was handled by American record producer Tay Keith.

Charts

Certifications

References

2021 singles
2021 songs
Drake (musician) songs
Songs written by Drake (musician)
Song recordings produced by Tay Keith
OVO Sound singles